A non-expanding horizon (NEH) is an enclosed null surface whose intrinsic structure is preserved. An NEH is the geometric prototype of an isolated horizon which describes a black hole in equilibrium with its exterior from the quasilocal perspective. It is based on the concept and geometry of NEHs that the two quasilocal definitions of black holes, weakly isolated horizons and isolated horizons, are developed.

Definition of NEHs 
A three-dimensional submanifold ∆ is defined as a generic (rotating and distorted) NEH if it respects the following conditions:

(i) ∆ is null and topologically ;
(ii) Along any null normal field  tangent to ∆, the outgoing expansion rate  vanishes;
(iii) All field equations hold on ∆, and the stress–energy tensor  on ∆ is such that  is a future-directed causal vector for any future-directed null normal .

Condition (i) is fairly trivial and just states the general fact that from a 3+1 perspective an NEH ∆ is foliated by spacelike 2-spheres ∆'=S2, where S2 emphasizes that ∆' is topologically compact with genus zero. The signature of ∆ is (0,+,+) with a degenerate temporal coordinate, and the intrinsic geometry of a foliation leaf ∆'=S2 is nonevolutional. The property  in condition (ii) plays a pivotal role in defining NEHs and the rich implications encoded therein will be extensively discussed below. Condition (iii) makes one feel free to apply the Newman–Penrose (NP) formalism of Einstein-Maxwell field equations to the horizon and its near-horizon vicinity; furthermore, the very energy inequality is motivated from the dominant energy condition and is a sufficient condition for deriving many boundary conditions of NEHs.

Note: In this article, following the convention set up in refs., "hat" over the equality symbol  means equality on the black-hole horizons (NEHs), and "hat" over quantities and operators (etc.) denotes those on a foliation leaf of the horizon. Also, ∆ is the standard symbol for both an NEH and the directional derivative ∆ in NP formalism, and we believe this won't cause an ambiguity.

Boundary conditions implied by the definition 

Now let's work out the implications of the definition of NEHs, and these results will be expressed in the language of NP formalism with the convention  (Note: unlike the original convention , this is the usual one employed in studying trapped null surfaces and quasilocal definitions of black holes). Being a null normal to ∆,  is automatically geodesic, and twist free, . For an NEH, the outgoing expansion rate  along  is vanishing, and consequently . Moreover, according to the Raychaudhuri-NP expansion-twist equation,

it follows that on ∆

where  is the NP-shear coefficient. Due to the assumed energy condition (iii), we have , and therefore  is nonnegative on ∆. The product  is of course nonnegative, too. As a summary,

Thus, the isolated horizon ∆ is nonevolutional and all foliation leaves ∆'=S2 look identical with one another.

The vanishing of Ricci-NP scalars  signifies that, there is no energy–momentum flux of any kind of charge across the horizon, such as electromagnetic waves, Yang–Mills flux or dilaton flux. Also, there should be no gravitational waves crossing the horizon; however, gravitational waves are propagation of perturbations of the spacetime continuum rather than flows of charges, and therefore depicted by four Weyl-NP scalars  (excluding ) rather than Ricci-NP quantities . According to the Raychaudhuri-NP shear equation

or the NP field equation on the horizon

it follows that . Moreover, the NP equation

implies that . To sum up, we have

This result is consistent with the physical scenario defining NEHs.

Remarks: Spin coefficients related to Raychaudhuri's equation 
For a better understanding of the previous section, we will briefly review the meanings of relevant NP spin coefficients in depicting null congruences. The tensor form of Raychaudhuri's equation governing null flows reads

where  is defined such that . The quantities in Raychaudhuri's equation are related with the spin coefficients via

Moreover, a null congruence is hypersurface orthogonal if .

Constraints from electromagnetic fields 
This is the simplest extension of vacuum NEHs, and the nonvanishing energy-stress tensor for electromagnetic fields reads

The boundary conditions derived in the previous section are applicable to generic NEHs. In the electromagnetic case,  can be specified in a more particular way. By the NP formalism of Einstein-Maxwell equations, one has

where  denote the three Maxwell-NP scalars. As an alternative to Eq(), we can see that the condition  also results from the NP equation

It follows straightforwardly that

These results demonstrate that, there are no electromagnetic waves across or along (\Phi_{02}) the NEH except the null geodesics generating the horizon. It is also worthwhile to point out that, the supplementary equation  in Eq() is only valid for electromagnetic fields; for example, in the case of Yang–Mills fields there will be  where  are Yang–Mills-NP scalars.

Adapted tetrad on NEHs and further properties 
Usually, null tetrads adapted to spacetime properties are employed to achieve the most succinct NP descriptions. For example, a null tetrad can be adapted to principal null directions once the Petrov type is known; also, at some typical boundary regions such as null infinity, timelike infinity, spacelike infinity, black hole horizons and cosmological horizons, tetrads can be adapted to boundary structures. Similarly, a preferred tetrad adapted to on-horizon geometric behaviors is employed in the literature to further investigate NEHs.

Now let's check the consequences of this kind of adapted tetrad. Since

Also, in such an adapted frame, the derivative  on  should be purely intrinsic; thus in the commutator

the coefficients for the directional derivatives  and ∆ must be zero, that is

Discussion 
So far, the definition and boundary conditions of NEHs have been introduced. The boundary conditions include those for an arbitrary NEH, specific characteristics for Einstein-Maxwell (electromagnetic) NEHs, as well as further properties in an adapted tetrad. Based on NEHs, WIHs which have valid surface gravity can be defined to generalize the black hole mechanics. WIHs are sufficient in studying the physics on the horizon, but for geometric purposes, stronger restrictions can be imposed to WIHs so as to introduce IHs, where the equivalence class of null normals  fully preserves the induced connection  on the horizon.

References

Black holes